Artiom Rozgoniuc (born 1 October 1995) is a Moldovan footballer who plays as a defender for Petrocub Hîncești.

Club career
In March 2020, Rozgoniuc signed for Petrocub Hîncești. In February 2022, he moved to Kazakhstan Premier League side Maktaaral.

International career
Rozgoniuc made his debut for the Moldova national team on 5 September 2017 in a World Cup qualifier against Wales.

References

External links

1995 births
Living people
Moldovan footballers
Moldovan expatriate footballers
Moldova under-21 international footballers
Moldova international footballers
Association football defenders
People from Rîbnița
FC Sheriff Tiraspol players
Speranța Nisporeni players
CS Petrocub Hîncești players
FC Sfîntul Gheorghe players
FC Maktaaral players
Moldovan Super Liga players
Kazakhstan Premier League players
Expatriate footballers in Kazakhstan
Moldovan expatriate sportspeople in Kazakhstan